The men's decathlon event at the 2003 All-Africa Games was held on October 11–12.

Results

References

Decathlon